Susana, Lady Walton  (30 August 1926 – 21 March 2010), born Susana Valeria Rosa Maria Gil Passo, was the Argentinian wife of the British composer Sir William Walton (1902–1983). She was a writer and the creator of the gardens of La Mortella on the island of Ischia, Italy.

Born in Buenos Aires in 1926, Lady Walton was the daughter of a prominent Argentinian lawyer, Dr Enrique Gil. She was educated at a college run by Spanish nuns where she took a diploma in accountancy followed by a degree as a public translator in English. She was working at the British Council in Buenos Aires when she met Walton in October 1948. They married two months later in December 1948. The couple settled on the Italian island of Ischia where she created the gardens of La Mortella. The residence hosted many celebrities, including Laurence Olivier and Vivien Leigh, Hans Werner Henze, W. H. Auden, Terence Rattigan, Binkie Beaumont, Maria Callas and Charlie Chaplin. William Walton died at La Mortella on 8 March 1983.

Lady Walton appeared alongside her husband in his only acting role; King Frederick Augustus II of Saxony as the King's wife Maria Anna of Bavaria in the 1983 miniseries Wagner, directed by Tony Palmer. She also appeared in Palmer's documentary William Walton: At the Haunted End of the Day (1981) and in Ken Russell's Classic Widows (1995).

Shortly after her marriage she had an abortion at Walton's insistence, as he did not want any children. She wrote two books and founded the William Walton Foundation in 1983. In 2002, Prince Charles visited La Mortella Garden and Lady Walton.

Lady Walton was awarded an honorary degree from the University of Nottingham, an MBE in 2000 and the Order of Merit of the Italian Republic (Grande Ufficiale). In 1990 she made a well-received recording of Walton's Façade.

She died on 21 March 2010, aged 83, from natural causes.

Books
 Walton, Susana. William Walton: Behind the Façade, Oxford University Press (1988).
 Walton, Susana. La Mortella: An Italian Garden Paradise, New Holland Publishers (2002).

References

External links
 Official site La Mortella.
 Giardini Ravino (Archived copy, formerly at www.ravino.it).
 Obituary in Italian.
.
.

1926 births
2010 deaths
Argentine expatriates in Italy
Women horticulturists and gardeners
Members of the Order of the British Empire
People from Buenos Aires
20th-century Argentine women writers
20th-century Argentine writers
20th-century Italian women writers